Nucleoporin 188 (Nup188) is a protein that in humans is encoded by the NUP188 gene.

Function 
Transport of macromolecules between the cytoplasm and nucleus occurs through nuclear pore complexes (NPCs) embedded in the nuclear envelope. NPCs are composed of subcomplexes, and NUP188 is part of one such subcomplex.

References

External links 
 

Nuclear pore complex